Bastiano da Sangallo (1481May 31, 1551) was an Italian sculptor, painter and architect of the Renaissance period, active mainly in Tuscany. He was a nephew of Giuliano da Sangallo and Antonio da Sangallo the Elder. He is usually known as Aristotile, a nickname he received from his air of sententious gravity. He was at first a pupil of Perugino, but afterwards became a follower of Michelangelo. Sangallo was mentioned by Vasari as one who made a small copy of the Cartoon of  Michelangelo's Battle of Cascina (1506).

References

1481 births
1551 deaths
15th-century Italian architects
16th-century Italian architects
15th-century Italian painters
Italian male painters
16th-century Italian painters
Italian Renaissance painters
Painters from Tuscany
Italian sculptors
Italian male sculptors